Ajaz Anwar (born 1946) is a Pakistani painter. He was a gold medalist at Punjab University, and he completed his M.A. in Fine Arts from Punjab University. Later, he went to teach at National College of Arts Lahore. His watercolour paintings show the grandeur of the old buildings and the cultural life in Lahore.

Life
Born in Ludhiana in 1946, his father was a cartoonist who apparently had stirred his passion from childhood and from whom he drew his inspiration. After obtaining his M.A. in Fine Arts and a Gold medal in 1967 from Punjab University (PUCAD) Lahore, he completed his Ph.D. in Muslim architecture, in Turkey in 1978 and proceeded to do a course on conservation of cultural property at UNESCO, Rome, in 1977. From 1972 he has been lecturing until he became professor and director of Art Gallery NCA, Lahore to date.

Old buildings
The old buildings of Lahore are the main theme of his paintings. He has tried to preserve those buildings in his paintings which are replaced by new style buildings or they are crumbling. These are the buildings of old Lahore; not all are historical, but common homes of common people are the centre of his attention. Natural lively colours bring the buildings to life.

People in his paintings
Although buildings are the main theme of his paintings and people are just there to make a normal life but the characters he used in his paintings are the quintessential of daily life in Lahore or Punjab. The characters are faceless, but they represent the common people found in the bazaars: A Tonga rider, women walking in the bazaar, children playing, milkman, old people talking, and sellers of all kinds.

Kites
Kites are almost always present in his paintings. His main themes are common homes or buildings and on the roof of every building there is a kite lover and on the sky above there are lot of kites colouring the sky.

Life in detail
With close observation we find a detailed life in his paintings. A woman is peeping from the window or behind the curtain, a cock is searching for food bits in the garbage.

Comments on his work
"In my paintings, I highlight the parts of Lahore that must be preserved. I remove skyscrapers and instead incorporate tongas and sweetmeat shops," he said in an interview. The main focus of his paintings are not human figures. "The human figures are only used to bring these crumbling buildings to life. People are not important aspects of my art because they are born and reborn whereas these buildings, once destroyed, will be lost forever."

Ajaz Anwar was the recipient of the President's "Pride of Performance in Painting" in 1997.

Exhibitions
Lahore, Ankara, Rawalpindi, Istanbul, Rome, Kampala, Chandigarh, Delhi and London.

Ajaz Anwar leads Lahore Conservation Society and doing his utmost to preserve the Lahore as it was and preserving Lahore's heritage has become a personal crusade. "This is not in good taste and it does not resemble the original shape of these shops at all," said Ajaz Anwar to BBC.

References

Aijaz Anwar documents cultural legacy of Lahore, Daily Times (Pakistan)
Theft of Ajaz Anwar's Painting

Pakistani watercolourists
Artists from Ludhiana
Living people
1946 births
Artists from Lahore
Academic staff of the National College of Arts
Punjabi artists
20th-century Pakistani painters
People from Lahore